Events from the year 1815 in Ireland.

Events
 March 28 – laying of the foundation stone of the Metropolitan Chapel (later known as the Catholic Pro-Cathedral), Marlborough Street, Dublin.
 March – poet William Drennan's Fugitive pieces in verse and prose published in Belfast.
 June 4 – lighthouse on Tuskar Rock first illuminated.
 July 6 – Charles Bianconi runs his first car (i.e. horse-drawn carriage) for conveyance of passengers, from Clonmel to Cahir.
 The river paddle steamer City of Cork is launched at Passage West, the first steamboat built in Ireland.
 The Religious Sisters of Charity are founded by Mary Aikenhead in Dublin.
 The Dublin Society purchases Leinster House, home of the Duke of Leinster, and founds a natural history museum there.
 Tenter House erected in Cork Street, Dublin, financed by Thomas Pleasants.
 St. Brendan's Hospital officially opened as the Richmond Lunatic Asylum, a national institution.

Births
March – William Wilde, surgeon, author and father of Oscar Wilde (died 1876).
11 June – Hans Crocker, lawyer and Wisconsin politician (died 1889).
24 July – Arnaud-Michel d'Abbadie, geographer (died 1893).
24 July – John Thomas Ball, lawyer, politician and Lord Chancellor of Ireland, 1875–1881 (died 1898).
August – Edmond Burke Roche, 1st Baron Fermoy, politician (died 1874).
3 November – John Mitchel, nationalist activist, solicitor and journalist (died 1875).
31 December – Chartres Brew, Gold commissioner, Chief Constable and judge in the Colony of British Columbia (died 1870).
Full date unknown – Alfred Elmore, painter (died 1881).

Deaths
31 December – Thomas Burke, artist (born 1749).
Ellen Hutchins, botanist (born 1785).

References

 
Years of the 19th century in Ireland
1810s in Ireland
Ireland
 Ireland